The 2018 Extreme Sailing Series was a series of GC32 catamaran class sailing events staged during 2018. The series began in March in Muscat, Oman, and the final event took place in Los Cabos, Mexico in late November and early December. The 2018 season was also the last season before the collapse of the Extreme Sailing Series.

Events

The 2018 series consisted of seven acts across three continents, and included the inaugural G32 World Championship in Riva del Garda, Italy.

See also

2018 Sailing World Cup

References

External links

Official website

2018
2018 in sailing
GC32 competitions
2018 in Omani sport
2018 in Italian sport
2018 in Spanish sport
2018 in Portuguese sport
2018 in Welsh sport
Sports competitions in Cardiff
2018 in American sports
2018 in Mexican sports